{{DISPLAYTITLE:C26H38O3}}
The molecular formula C26H38O3 (molar mass: 398.578 g/mol, exact mass: 398.2821 u) may refer to:

 Nandrolone cypionate
 Pentagestrone
 Testosterone hexahydrobenzoate